Sirtori is a comune (municipality) in the Province of Lecco in the Italian region Lombardy, located about  northeast of Milan and about  southwest of Lecco.

The municipality of Sirtori contains the frazione (subdivision) Bevera di Sirtori.

Sirtori borders the following municipalities: Barzago, Barzanò, Castello di Brianza, Missaglia, Perego, Rovagnate, Viganò.

Demographic evolution

References

Cities and towns in Lombardy